I Could Never Say Goodbye may refer to:

"I Could Never Say Goodbye", a duet with Amy Grant by Randy Stonehill from Love Beyond Reason, 1985
"I Could Never Say Goodbye", a song by Enya from Dark Sky Island